Sahib Singh Verma (15 March 1943 – 30 June 2007) was an Indian politician and the former senior vice-president of the Bharatiya Janata Party. He served as Chief Minister of Delhi (1996–1998) and was member of 13th Lok Sabha, Parliament of India (1999–2004). He served as the Union Labour Minister of India.

Life 
Sahib Singh was born on 15 March 1943 in Mundka village, Delhi to Mir Singh, a farmer, and Bharpai Devi in a Jat family. In early childhood he was deeply influenced by Arya Samaj.

Singh had a PhD degree in Library Science, and started work as librarian in Bhagat Singh College, Delhi. He also held a master's degree in Arts, (M.A.) and also in Library Science from Aligarh Muslim University.

In 1954, when he was just 11, he and Sahib Kaur were married. They had two sons and three daughters and one of his sons, Parvesh Verma is Member of parliament of Lok Sabha from West Delhi.

Political career
He was active in the Rashtriya Swayamsevak Sangh. He had also served the World Jat Aryan Foundation, as its president.

In 1977 he was elected to the Municipal Corporation of Delhi and took the Oath as a Councillor by the hands of Guru Radha Kishan. Initially he won as a Janata Party candidate and was re-elected on a BJP ticket. He became the Education and Development Minister in the Delhi government in 1993.

In 1996, after Madan Lal Khurana was embroiled in a corruption crisis, Sahib Singh became the Chief Minister of Delhi. Singh served as CM for two and a half years, facing increasing rivalry from Khurana. Following an onion price crisis, he was replaced by Sushma Swaraj.

Subsequently, he won the Lok Sabha elections, 1999 from Outer Delhi with a margin of over two lakh votes. In 2002, he became Minister of Labour in the Vajpayee government, and was known as "bull in a China shop" for standing up against the bureaucrats against lowering the Provident Fund interest rate. He was defeated in the 2004 polls.

He died in a road accident in Rajasthan in 2007.

See also 
 Verma cabinet

References

External links
 

1943 births
2007 deaths
Chief Ministers of Delhi
Chief ministers from Bharatiya Janata Party
Aligarh Muslim University alumni
People from Delhi
Road incident deaths in India
India MPs 1999–2004
Members of the Delhi Legislative Assembly
Lok Sabha members from Delhi
Bharatiya Janata Party politicians from Delhi
People from South Delhi district
Accidental deaths in India